Großpetersdorf is a municipality in Burgenland in the district of Oberwart in Austria.

Geography 
The municipality is composed of Großpetersdorf, Kleinpetersdorf, Kleinzicken, Miedlingsdorf, and Welgersdorf.

Population

Politics 
Of the 25 positions on the municipal council, the SPÖ has 15, and the ÖVP 10.

Culture 
 Catholic parish church Grosspetersdorf
 Protestant parish church Grosspetersdorf
 Lucky Town, a staged little western city in Grosspetersdorf, which is opened for visitors every Monday from June to August. Lucky Town inspires with country music, western interieur, great food and western shows.

Personalities
Frederick Lowy, Canadian psychiatrist, medical educator and president & vice-chancellor of Concordia University

References

Cities and towns in Oberwart District